Adam Musiał (18 December 1948 – 18 November 2020) was a Polish football player and later became a football manager.

He played for clubs such as Wisła Kraków, Arka Gdynia, Hereford United (England)  and Eagles Yonkers New York (USA).

He played for Polish national team, for which he played 34 matches.

He was a participant at the 1974 FIFA World Cup, where Poland won the third place.

Honours 

Poland
1974 FIFA World Cup: third place

References

1948 births
2020 deaths
Polish footballers
Poland international footballers
Polish football managers
Hereford United F.C. players
1974 FIFA World Cup players
Polish expatriate footballers
Expatriate footballers in England
Arka Gdynia players
Wisła Kraków players
Wisła Kraków managers
Lechia Gdańsk managers
People from Wieliczka
Sportspeople from Lesser Poland Voivodeship
Association football defenders